Events from the year 1516 in Ireland.

Incumbent
Lord: Henry VIII

Events
The Book of Fenagh  is a manuscript of prose and poetry written in Classical Irish by Muirgheas mac Pháidín Ó Maolconaire in the monastery at  Fenagh, County Leitrim. It was commissioned by Tadhg O'Roddy, the coarb of the monastery, and is believed to derive from the "old Book of Caillín", a lost work about Caillín, founder of the monastery. Ó Maolconaire began work about 1516.

Births

Deaths

References

 
1510s in Ireland
Ireland
Years of the 16th century in Ireland